Lazar Lazarevich Matveev (Russian: Ла́зарь Лазаре́вич Матве́ев; born 17 April 1927) is a former Soviet intelligence leader. He served as a senior KGB liaison officer to the Stasi in Dresden, East Germany, during 1982 to 1989, where Vladimir Putin, the current President of Russia, worked for him.

On Matveev's 90th birthday, Russian President Vladimir Putin and his former KGB colleagues Sergey Chemezov and Nikolay Tokarev who also worked for Matveev, visited him in his home in Zhulebino, Moscow to celebrate his birthday. Putin brought him a wrist watch with the presidential coat of arms and a rare copy of the Pravda newspaper that was published on 17 April 1927 – the day Matveev was born.

References

External links

People from Krasnoyarsk Krai
1927 births
Living people
KGB officers